Gadsby Lake is a lake in Alberta, Canada.

Gadsby Lake has the name of James Gadsby, a pioneer citizen.

See also
List of lakes of Alberta

References

Lakes of Alberta